

QP54A Macrocyclic lactones

QP54AA Avermectins
QP54AA01 Ivermectin
QP54AA02 Abamectin
QP54AA03 Doramectin
QP54AA04 Eprinomectin
QP54AA05 Selamectin
QP54AA06 Emamectin
QP54AA51 Ivermectin, combinations
QP54AA52 Abamectin, combinations
QP54AA54 Eprinomectin, combinations

QP54AB Milbemycins
QP54AB01 Milbemycin oxime
QP54AB02 Moxidectin
QP54AB51 Milbemycin oxime, combinations
QP54AB52 Moxidectin, combinations

QP54AX Other macrocyclic lactones
Empty group

References

P54